The Korean People's won, sometimes known as the North Korean won (Symbol: ₩; Code: KPW;) or Democratic People's Republic of Korea won, is the official currency of North Korea. It is subdivided into 100 chon. The currency is issued by the Central Bank of the Democratic People's Republic of Korea, based in the North Korean capital city of Pyongyang.

Etymology 

Won is a cognate of the Chinese yuan and Japanese yen. All three names derive from the Hanja , which means "round shape." The won is subdivided into 100 chon (McCune-Reischauer: chŏn; Revised Romanization: jeon).

History

1947–2009 
After the division of Korea, North Korea continued using the Korean yen for two years, until the Central Bank of the Democratic People's Republic of Korea was established on 6 December 1947 and the first North Korean won was issued. In February 1959, the second North Korean won was introduced, equal to 100 old won.

From 1978 on, the North Korean government maintained an iconic rate of 2.16 won to the US dollar (which is said to have been based upon Kim Jong-il's birthday, 16 February).
Over the decades, however, rampant inflation eroded the currency's value, and from 2001 the government abandoned the rate in favor of those closer to the black market's. A report by defectors from North Korea claimed the black market rate was ₩570 to the Chinese yuan (about ₩4,000 per U.S. dollar) in June 2009.

2009 revaluation 
The third North Korean won was introduced in a revaluation , the first in 50 years. North Koreans were given seven days to exchange a maximum of ₩100,000 (worth approximately US$40 on the black market) in ₩1,000 notes for ₩10 notes, but after protests by some of the populace, the limit was raised to ₩150,000 in cash and ₩300,000 in bank savings. The official exchange rate at this time was around $740, but black market value of the ₩150,000 was estimated to be near $30. The revaluation, seen as a move against private market activity, wiped out many North Koreans' savings. The Times speculated that the move may have been an attempt by the North Korean government to control price inflation and destroy the fortunes of local black market money traders. The announcement was made to foreign embassies but not in North Korean state media.

As part of the process, the old notes ceased to be legal tender on 30 November 2009, but notes valued in the new won were not distributed until 7 December 2009. North Koreans were thus unable to exchange any money for goods or services for a week, and most shops, restaurants and transport services were shut down. The only services that remained open were those catering to the political elite and foreigners who both continued to trade exclusively in foreign currency. The measure led to concerns amongst North Korean officials that the move would result in civil unrest. China's Xinhua news agency described North Korean citizens as being in a "collective panic"; army bases were put on alert and there were unconfirmed reports of public protests in the streets in a handful of North Korean cities and towns, forcing authorities to slightly increase the amount of currency people were allowed to exchange. Piles of old bills were also set on fire in separate locations across the country, old paper notes were dumped in a stream (against laws of the desecration of images of Kim Il-sung), and two black market traders were shot dead in the streets of Pyongsong by local police, according to international reports. Authorities threatened "merciless punishment" for any person violating the rules of the currency change.

Pictures of the new notes were published on 4 December 2009 in the Chosun Shinbo, a North Korean newspaper based in Japan. The paper claimed that the measure would weaken the free market and strengthen the country's socialist system. However, the won plummeted 96 percent against the U.S. dollar in the ensuing days after revaluation. Authorities eventually raised the limit to 500,000 won, Chosun said, and promised no probes into savings of up to one million won, and unlimited withdrawals if savings of more than one million were properly accounted for.

In February 2010, some of the curbs on the free market were eased and a senior party official sacked after incidents of unrest. Pak Nam-gi, the director of the Planning and Finance Department of North Korea's ruling Workers' Party, was executed later in 2010. North Korea denied any serious crisis relating to the revaluation.

Coins

First Won 
No coins were issued under the first won of 1947–1959.

Second Won 
The first North Korean coins for circulation were minted in 1959 in denominations of 1, 5, and 10 chon. These coins were often restruck with the original dates in later years; however, 1970 and 1974 dates also appear on the 1 and 5 chon. In 1978, 50 chon coins featuring the Chollima Statue and a rising sun were introduced into circulation during the 1979 currency reform to allow greater flexibility for vendors by eliminating the 50 chon banknote and large amounts of "small change" coinage carried. In 1987, 1 won coins featuring the Grand People's Study House were introduced, but did not fully replace the 1 won note which remained legal tender.

When the historic 2.16 peg to the dollar was abandoned in 2001 to allow for greater convertibility the coins began to lose value. After 2003, these coins were rarely seen in circulation but were still redeemable. Later, a new set of coins was introduced in 2005 in denominations of 5, 10, 50, and 100 won. These coins were less impressive compared to the older series, being very plain and generic in design. All circulation coins of the Second Won were struck in aluminum.

Following other socialist economies like Cuba and China, North Korea developed a special system of marking coins for two groups of foreign visitors. Issued in 1983, these coins were part of the "Pakkundon" convertible series. Coins with no "stars" were for general circulation in North Korea, coins marked with one star were for "socialist visitors", and coins marked with two stars were designated for "capitalist visitors". A fourth set, intended for collectors rather than circulation, was struck with the word "specimen" or "example" in Korean characters in the areas where the stars would be. The specimen/example set is the least common of the four. Besides the general circulating coins, there is an abundance of different commemorative coins minted in the name of the DPRK. Most, if not all of them, are sold to foreign numismatists. Some of these are official, state approved coins, others are not.

Third Won 
Coins were issued in 10, 50 chon and 1 won denominations in 2002, and 1 and 5 chon denominations in 2008. All denominations are struck in aluminum. These coins feature the national coat of arms on the obverse and flowers, particularly the Kimjongilia and the Kimilsungia, on the reverse of the 10 and 50 chon coins. A magnolia adorns the 1 won coin.

Initially struck in 2002, the coins were intended for use shortly after the dollar peg was removed from the currency. The 50 chon and 1 won coins were smaller than the previous designs, while the new 10 chon coin was the same size as the old. Hyperinflation became a very sudden reality, however, and the new coins were never released as planned. In 2008, 1 and 5 chon coins were also struck when a plan for monetary revaluation began. The coins were finally released into circulation in December 2009, but due to the flawed nature of the revaluation, these coins again have very little value, the 1 and 5 chon coins in particular being virtually irrelevant.

Banknotes 

The first banknotes of "North Korea" were issued in 1945 by the Soviet-backed provisional government above the 38th parallel. These were in denominations of 1, 5, 10, and 100 won. These were discontinued shortly after Soviet forces withdrew and recognized the newly independent state.

First Won 
This currency was issued in all-banknote form, with the first banknotes of this issue in denominations of 15, 20, and 50 chon along with 1, 5, 10 and 100 won in 1947. The chon notes had stylized art designs, while the won denominations were fairly uniform in design, featuring a farmer and a worker standing together and holding the symbolic tools. This currency was later revalued in 1959 at a rate of one new won to 100 old won to curb the inflation that had occurred as a result of the Korean War.

Second Won 
In 1959, the old won was replaced with the Second Won, with price and exchange rates fixed to the U.S. dollar. This banknote series was issued in denominations of 50 chon, and 1, 5, 10, 50, and 100 won. These notes were much larger than the previous issue and depicted images representing various industries in the North Korean economy.

In 1979, the currency was again reformed, and a new banknote series was issued in denominations of 1, 5, 10, 50, and 100 won. There is ongoing speculation as to why this move was made. All 1959 banknotes were removed from circulation. Circulating coins, however, were not affected by this change. The designs for this issue were much more symbolic and charismatic than previous ones, with Kim Il-sung featuring for the first time on the 100 won note.

In 1992, another redesign was carried out for banknotes, again in denominations of 1, 5, 10, 50, and 100 won. Older notes were once again withdrawn. These notes were smaller and crisper than the previous issue and depicted more modern themes. The 5 and 10 won banknotes were again issued in 1998, along with a 500 won banknote that same year but were stamped rather than engraved reflecting poorer production quality. In 2002, 1,000 and 5,000 won notes were introduced, followed by a 200 won note in 2005. The former two were identical in design to the 100 won though differing in colors and added security features, but the colored fields behind the text no longer extended all the way to the margins. In 2007, the 500 won had also been revised in this same manner along with being engraved for the first time to protect against counterfeiting. From 1998 onwards, all notes were dated using the Juche year (Juche year) along with the standard dating.

In 2005, the Central Bank of the Democratic People's Republic of Korea issued commemorative 200, 500, 1000 and 5000 won notes to celebrate the 60th anniversary of the foundation of North Korea. It consists of an overprint on its regular issue notes.

In 2007, a commemorative version of this banknote series was released, stamped "Great Leader Comrade Kim Il Sung's 95th Birthday" on all denominations.

Banknotes in circulation for the second won, up to December 2009, were as follows:

Third won 
In 2009,  was initiated to tackle hyperinflation and black market activities. Unlike previous reforms, the 2009 move sparked a nationwide panic when it was announced there would be a two-week waiting period between the withdrawal of the old currency and the introduction of the new currency, coupled with an exchange limit of only 500,000 old won for each person, effectively wiping out savings. The state eventually pulled back on most exchange limits; however, the revaluation proved to be a failure.

Like the coins for this series, some of the denominations were initially printed in 2002 but were never released into circulation, pointing to a planned monetary revaluation much earlier than 2009 that was never carried out.

The current series of banknotes of the third won are issued in denominations of 5, 10, 50, 100, 200, 500, 1,000, 2,000, and 5,000 won. Kim Il-sung is depicted only on the obverse of the highest denomination, with the 100 won note featuring the Magnolia (National Flower) and other notes depicting North Koreans of different professions and various monuments in North Korea. The exchange rate was 100 second won to 1 third won.

Unlike all previous series, these notes were all uniform in dimensions rather than staggered in size from smallest to largest. There are rumors that the original designs for the 1,000 and 2,000 won notes depicted Kim Il-sung and had similar design features to the 5,000 won that were scrapped and destroyed due to counterfeiters or thieves breaking into a bank warehouse and stealing early notes or printing materials, resulting in a total redesign of the two denominations in question.

In 2012, another commemorative series of banknotes was released, this time in the 2002–2009 series but similarly stamped "Great Leader Comrade Kim Il Sung's 100th Birthday." Once again this stamp appeared on all denominations.

In 2018, 1,000 and 2,000 won notes were released with an overprint referencing the 70th Anniversary of its independence.

On 25 July 2014, a new 5,000 won note dated 2013 was released into circulation. Instead of depicting the portrait of North Korea's founder Kim Il-sung, the note depicts an image of his birthplace in Mangyondae and on the back the International Friendship Exhibition in Myohyangsan that displays gifts he and his son Kim Jong-il received from foreign leaders. There has been ongoing speculation that this could indicate plans for higher denominations to be released later which would depict Kim Il-sung, Kim Jong-il, or possibly both. However the official reason behind the change was to combat counterfeiters.

Donpyo emergency currency 

Lockdowns due to the COVID-19 pandemic have caused shortages in ink and paper used to print regular KPW banknotes, resulting in the issuance in the second half of 2021 of an emergency currency printed with the word "donpyo" (돈표 or "money coupon"). It is denominated 5,000 won and printed in red ink on white paper of poor quality.

Shortages in regular KPW banknotes after 2020 have also resulted in a premium in their exchange values in the black markets. The donpyo is discounted versus regular banknotes at only 3,800-4,000 KPW, and KPW banknotes have even appreciated versus the US dollar from 8,000 KPW to 5,200 KPW/USD.

Exchange rates 
The North Korean won is not traded in the international markets. It is traded in the unofficial black markets at around US$1 = 8,000 KPW as of 2019 and around $1 = 5,000 KPW as of 2021.

Concurrent use with foreign currencies

Before 2009 
North Korean won are intended exclusively for North Korean citizens, and the Bank of Trade (무역은행) issued a separate currency (or foreign exchange certificates) for visitors, like many other socialist states. However, North Korea made two varieties of foreign exchange certificates, one for visitors from "socialist countries" which were colored red and hence nicknamed "red won", and the other for visitors from "capitalist countries" which were colored blue/green and hence known as "blue won".

For the 1978 banknote series, foreign certificates, called "Pakkundon", meaning "exchangeable money" were implemented by an overstamp and serial number color. This was intended to protect the value of the national currency in North Korea's command economy. These were first released in 1983 in two forms, one for "socialist visitors" which had a red stamp, and one for "capitalist visitors" which had a green stamp. Another series was released in 1986 with either a blue or red Guilloché style stamp. These were issued in all denominations, except for the ₩100 note, presumably because it was assumed by the government that foreign visitors to North Korea would not show proper respect for its depiction of Kim Il-sung. These notes were discontinued in 1988 and replaced with a new series of Pakkundon in all banknote form that was more distinguishable and unmistakable from generic circulation currency.

In 1988, the Bank of Trade (무역은행) (as opposed to the Central Bank) issued two unique series of foreign certificates. They both included 1 chon, 5 chon, 10 chon, 50 chon, ₩1, ₩5, ₩10, and ₩50. The series for "capitalist visitors" was blue-green, while the series for "socialist visitors" was pink. The chon notes had a simple design of patterns and corresponding values, while the socialist won notes depict the International Friendship Exhibition, and the capitalist won notes depict the Chollima Statue.

FECs were used until 1999, then officially abolished in 2002, in favor of visitors paying directly with hard currencies.

Since 2009 
After the 2009 revaluation the BBC reported that in some department stores in Pyongyang, the North Korean won is not accepted; the stores only take Japanese yen and U.S. dollars. As of 2018 it has evolved to most North Korean stores accepting U.S. dollars, euros and Chinese yuan/renminbi, with change from transactions primarily returned in renminbi or U.S. dollars.

Foreign visitors (and privileged locals) can buy goods priced in 'tied' won using a local debit card, which is credited when exchanging foreign currency at the official bank rate of around 104 won/USD or 130 won/EUR (as of 2012). This card can be used for instance at the famous Pyongyang Department Store No. 1 or at the different stores at the international hotels, where the goods are priced at the tied won rate. This tied won does not exist in the form of bank notes, and is effectively a separate currency and accounting unit for sales involving foreign exchange.

In normal stores and markets goods are priced in what has been called the 'untied' won or free market rate which is represented by regular KPW banknotes. At for instance the Tongil Market and the Kwangbok Department Store (a.k.a. the Chinese Market) there are semi-official exchange agents who will give in regular banknotes around 8,000 KPW/USD or 10,000 KPW/EUR to locals and foreign visitors alike (as of 2012, or 77 times the tied or official rate). The untied KPW is used for prices in normal shops outside restricted state shops/tied won shops.

See also 
 Economy of North Korea
 South Korean won

References

External links 
 

Currencies of North Korea
Currencies introduced in 1947